Kuzminki is a station on Moscow Metro's Tagansko-Krasnopresnenskaya Line. The station was opened on 31 December 1966 as part of the Zhdanovsky radius.

Name
It is named after the Kuzminki District in southeastern Moscow where it is situated.

Overview

The station has two underground vestibules interlinked with subways under the Volgogradskiy avenue with access to Zelenodolskaya, Marshala Chuikova and Zhigulevskaya streets with light glazed pavilions on the surface. Up to Kuzminki the Line follows Volgogradsky Avenue to the southeast. However afterwards the line turns perpendicular and adjoins the parallel Ryazanskiy Avenue and then follows it. As a result, the station has high passenger traffic due to public transport arriving from the southeastern suburban towns which in March 2002 totalled 116,100 passengers daily.

Design

The station is a typical pillar-trispan design of the 1960s with a modest theme (architects L.A. Shagurina and M.N.Korneeva) of white marbled pillars and creme and red coloured ceramic tiles on the walls, which are also decorated with cast bas reliefs that contain images of forest animals (artist G.G. Derviz). The floor is covered with grey and red granite.

External links
metro.ru
mymetro.ru
KartaMetro.info — Station location and exits on Moscow map (English/Russian)

Moscow Metro stations
Railway stations in Russia opened in 1966
Tagansko-Krasnopresnenskaya Line
Railway stations located underground in Russia